Adam Crosby may refer to:

 Adam Brown Crosby, Canadian politician
 Adam Crosby (MP), English MP for Appleby (UK Parliament constituency)
Adam Crosby (actor), in Pineapple Express (film)